The Dr. Franz Alexander House, at 1011 W. Cielo Dr. in Palm Springs, California, was listed on the National Register of Historic Places in 2016.

It is a Modern-style building built in 1956.

It was designed by architect, industrial designer, inventor and builder Walter S. White (1917-2002).

References

Moderne architecture in California
National Register of Historic Places in Riverside County, California
Houses completed in 1956
1956 establishments in California
Buildings and structures in Palm Springs, California